Rémi Santiago (born 10 December 1980) is a French ski jumper. He competed in the large hill event at the 2002 Winter Olympics.

References

1980 births
Living people
French male ski jumpers
Olympic ski jumpers of France
Ski jumpers at the 2002 Winter Olympics
Sportspeople from Chambéry